The Mountains and the Trees is a Canadian folk rock band whose sole constant member is Jon Janes of Pasadena, Newfoundland and Labrador. The band is now based in St. John's. Canadian singer-songwriter Hayden is a significant musical influence. In addition to Hayden, the musical style has also been likened to that of Iron & Wine and Julie Doiron. Critical reception has been generally positive. Rachel Sanders of Exclaim! wrote, "[Janes'] thoroughly modern folk style combines traditional instrumentation with subtle but perfectly integrated effects."

The band released the EP Paper or Plastic in 2006. The album Document, released in 2007, was recorded at the First United Church in Corner Brook. The EP Hop, Skip, and a Jump was released in 2009.

References

External links 

 The Mountains and the Trees at CBC Radio 3

Musical groups established in 2006
Canadian folk rock groups
Musical groups from St. John's, Newfoundland and Labrador
2006 establishments in Newfoundland and Labrador
Canadian indie folk groups